Rammohan (born 5 October) is an Indian actor who works in the Malayalam film industry. He debuted in the critically acclaimed movie Karie.

Personal life 
He married Deepthi on 6 April 2009, and has two children named Anavadhya and Sreejay.

Filmography

Films

Web series

Musical Albums

References

1985 births
Living people